Alexandre Vincent (born 25 April 1994) is a French professional footballer who plays as a winger for  club Le Mans.

Career
Vincent is a youth exponent from Auxerre. He made his Ligue 2 debut on 23 January 2015 against Orléans in a 0–0 away draw. He scored his first goal on 25 April 2015 against Châteauroux in a 2–1 away defeat. On 30 May 2015, he appeared in the 2015 Coupe de France Final as a second-half substitute.

In July 2018, Vincent signed a one-year contract with Laval. He left at the end of the contract, and eventually signed for Rouen in January 2020.

In July 2020, Vincent had a successful trial with Concarneau, and joined the club for the 2020–21 season. After having played for Chambly, Vincent joined Le Mans in 2022.

References

External links

1994 births
Living people
Association football wingers
French footballers
AJ Auxerre players
Stade Lavallois players
FC Rouen players
US Concarneau players
FC Chambly Oise players
Le Mans FC players
Ligue 2 players
Championnat National players
Championnat National 2 players
Championnat National 3 players